Ulodemis is a genus of moths belonging to the subfamily Tortricinae of the family Tortricidae.

Species
Ulodemis hyalura Diakonoff, 1983
Ulodemis idjen Diakonoff, 1941
Ulodemis pangerango Diakonoff, 1941
Ulodemis tridentata Liu & Bai, 1982
Ulodemis trigrapha Meyrick, 1907

See also
List of Tortricidae genera

References

 , 2005: World catalogue of insects volume 5 Tortricidae.
 , 1982: Notes on Chinese Ulodemis Meyrick (Lepidoptera: Tortricidae) with description of a new species. Acta Entomologica Sinica 25 (2): 204–205.

External links
tortricidae.com

Archipini
Tortricidae genera